Peter A. Griffin (July 19, 1937 – October 18, 1998) was a mathematician, author, and blackjack expert and is one of the original seven members of the Blackjack Hall of Fame. He authored The Theory of Blackjack, considered a classic analysis of the mathematics behind the game of casino 21.

Early life
Griffin was a native of New Jersey, one of three children, with a brother, poet Alan MacDougall, and a sister, Barbara Dan, writer. His grandfather Frank Loxley Griffin was a mathematician at Reed College who had written various mathematics textbooks.

Griffin's father was an actuary who went on to head up a labor/management consulting company in Chicago.

Griffin grew up in Williamsport, Pennsylvania, Chicago and Portland, Oregon, and married Lydia.

Academic studies and teaching
He studied at Portland State University, and received a master's degree from the University of California at Davis. He taught statistics, calculus and differential equations at California State University-Sacramento from 1965 until his death on October 18, 1998 from prostate cancer.

Blackjack
His first exposure to blackjack was in 1970, when he proposed a course on the mathematics of gambling, and went to Nevada  to do some research. As the New York Times put it, he "promptly got his clock cleaned," and this incentivized him to do more serious research on the subject. 
He was known for compiling extensive statistics on blackjack players in Atlantic City, and then comparing patterns against players in Las Vegas or Reno.<ref>"Professional gamblers at work: Self-styled blackjack tournament experts take a bath in Reno" Blackjack Forum, Volume VI #4, December 1986</ref>

Griffin was one of the first to calculate the percentage disadvantage of an "average" blackjack player, at 2%. He was also the first to calculate the average gains by hand realized from varying basic strategy.
Griffin wrote the 1979 book, The Theory of Blackjack: The Compleat Card Counter’s Guide to the Casino Game of 21, which is considered to be a classic in the field.

Griffin along with Anthony Curtis is cited as coming up with the title for the main column of the Las Vegas Advisor, 'Couponomy'. Curtis states "Griffin pointed out that the suffix “omy” typically means to extract, so Couponomy meant extraction via coupon".

The main passion of Peter Griffin remained teaching, which is where he devoted most of his working life.

Peter Griffin died on October 18, 1998 at the age of 61.

Works
 The Theory of Blackjack, 1979, Huntington Press, 
 Extra Stuff: Gambling Ramblings'', 1991, Huntington Press,

References

Notes
 Griffin is unrelated to the private, casino-consulting firm Griffin Investigations.

External links
 Peter Griffin at BlackjackHero.com

American blackjack players
1937 births
1998 deaths
Portland State University alumni
People from New Jersey
University of California, Davis alumni